Spiraea , sometimes spelled spirea in common names, and commonly known as meadowsweets or steeplebushes, is a genus of about 80 to 100 species of shrubs in the family Rosaceae. They are native to the temperate Northern Hemisphere, with the greatest diversity in eastern Asia.

The genus formerly included the herbaceous species now segregated into the genera Filipendula and Aruncus; recent genetic evidence has shown that Filipendula is only distantly related to Spiraea, belonging in the subfamily Rosoideae.

Description

Spiraea plants are hardy, deciduous-leaved shrubs. The leaves are simple and usually short stalked, and are arranged in a spiralling, alternate fashion. The leaf margins are usually toothed, occasionally cut or lobed, and rarely smooth. Stipules are absent.

The many small flowers of Spiraea shrubs are clustered together in inflorescences, usually in dense panicles, umbrella-like corymbs, or grape-like clusters. The radial symmetry of each flower is five fold, with the flowers usually bisexual, rarely unisexual. The flowers have five sepals and five white, pink, or reddish petals that are usually longer than the sepals. Each flower has many (15 to 60) stamens. The fruit is an aggregate of follicles.

Ecology
Spiraea species are used as food plants by the larvae of many Lepidoptera species, including the brown-tail, the small emperor moth, the grey dagger, the setaceous Hebrew character, and the moth Hypercompe indecisa.

The leaves of S. betulifolia are eaten by blue grouse in spring, and the plant is browsed by deer in summer.

Uses

Food 
Native Americans ate the species S. betulifolia.

Horticulture

Many species of Spiraea are used as ornamental plants in temperate climates, particularly for their showy clusters of dense flowers. Some species bloom in the spring, others in midsummer.

The following species, hybrids and cultivars are among those found in cultivation:

S. 'Arguta'
S. betulifolia
S. canescens
S. cantoniensis
 S. × cinerea
S. douglasii
S. japonica
S. nipponica
S. prunifolia
S. × pseudosalicifolia
S. salicifolia
S. 'Snow White'
S. thunbergii
S. trichocarpa
S. × vanhouttei
S. veitchii

Spiraea 'Arguta' (bridal wreath) and Spiraea ×  cinerea 'Grefsheim' have won the Royal Horticultural Society's Award of Garden Merit.

Traditional medicine
Spiraea contain salicylates. Acetylsalicylic acid was first isolated from Filipendula ulmaria, a species at the time classified in the genus Spiraea. The word "aspirin" was coined by adding a- (for acetylation) to spirin, from the German Spirsäure, a reference to Spiraea.

Native American groups have various medicinal uses for local Spiraea species. S. betulifolia is used for abdominal pain and made into a tea. The Blackfoot use S. splendens root in an enema and to treat venereal conditions.

Other
Native Americans found S. douglasii useful for making brooms and hanging seafood to cook.

Species

Spiraea affinis
Spiraea alaskaense
Spiraea alba – narrow-leaved meadowsweet, pale bridewort
Spiraea albiflora
Spiraea amoena
Spiraea arcuata
Spiraea baldschuanica
Spiraea bella
Spiraea betulifolia – white meadowsweet
Spiraea blumei
Spiraea calcicola
Spiraea cana
Spiraea canescens – Himalayan spiraea
Spiraea cantoniensis – Reeve's spiraea
Spiraea chamaedryfolia – elm-leaf spiraea, germander meadowsweet
Spiraea crenata
Spiraea decumbens
Spiraea douglasii – Douglas' spiraea, steeplebush
Spiraea gemmata
Spiraea henryi
Spiraea hypericifolia – Iberian meadowsweet
Spiraea japonica – Japanese spiraea
Spiraea latifolia - broadleaf meadowsweet
Spiraea longigemmis
Spiraea media – Russian spiraea
Spiraea micrantha
Spiraea miyabei
Spiraea mollifolia
Spiraea nervosa
Spiraea nipponica
Spiraea prunifolia – bridal-wreath spiraea
Spiraea pubescens
Spiraea rosthornii
Spiraea salicifolia – bridewort, willowleaf meadowsweet
Spiraea sargentiana
Spiraea septentrionalis – northern meadowsweet
Spiraea splendens – rose meadowsweet
Spiraea stevenii – beauverd spirea
Spiraea thunbergii – Thunberg's meadowsweet
Spiraea tomentosa – hardhack, steeplebush
Spiraea trichocarpa – Korean meadow spiraea
Spiraea trilobata – Asian meadowsweet
Spiraea veitchii
Spiraea virginiana – Virginia spiraea
Spiraea wilsonii
Spiraea yunnanensis

Formerly placed here
Spiraea lobata, moved to Filipendula rubra
Spiraea discolor, moved to Holodiscus discolor

Hybrids
There are also numerous named hybrids, some occurring naturally in the wild, others bred in gardens, including several important ornamental plants:

Spiraea × arguta (S. × multiflora × S. thunbergii) – garland spiraea
Spiraea × billiardii (S. douglasii × S. salicifolia) – Billiard's spiraea
Spiraea × blanda (S. nervosa × S. cantoniensis)
Spiraea × brachybotrys (S. canescens × S. douglasii)
Spiraea × bumalda (S. japonica × S. albiflora)
Spiraea × cinerea (S. hypericifolia × S. cana)
Spiraea × conspicua (S. japonica × S. latifolia)
Spiraea × fontenaysii (S. canescens × S. salicifolia)
Spiraea × foxii (S. japonica × S. betulifolia)
Spiraea × gieseleriana (S. cana × S. chamaedryfolia)
Spiraea × macrothyrsa (S. douglasii × S. latifolia)
Spiraea × multiflora (S. crenata × S. hypericifolia)
Spiraea × notha (S. betulifolia × S. latifolia)
Spiraea × nudiflora (S. chamaedryfolia × S. bella)
Spiraea × pikoviensis (S. crenata × S. media)
Spiraea × pyramidata (S. betulifolia × S. douglasii) – pyramid spiraea
Spiraea × revirescens (S. amoena × S. japonica)
Spiraea × sanssouciana (S. japonica × S. douglasii)
Spiraea × schinabeckii (S. chamaedryfolia × S. trilobata)
Spiraea × semperflorens (S. japonica × S. salicifolia)
Spiraea × vanhouttei (S. trilobata × S. cantoniensis) – Van Houtte's spiraea
Spiraea × watsoniana (S. douglasii × S. densiflora)

References

External links

GRIN Species Records of Spiraea. Germplasm Resources Information Network (GRIN).
Spiraea. Integrated Taxonomic Information System (ITIS).
 

 
Spiraeeae
Rosaceae genera